Diodes Incorporated is a global manufacturer and supplier of application specific standard products within the discrete, logic, analog, and mixed-signal semiconductor markets. Diodes serves the consumer electronics, computing, communications, industrial, and automotive markets.

Diodes' products include diodes, rectifiers, transistors, MOSFETs, protection devices, functional specific arrays, single gate logic, amplifiers and comparators, Hall effect and temperature sensors; power management devices, including LED drivers, AC-DC converters and controllers, DC-DC switching and linear voltage regulators, and voltage references along with special function devices, such as USB power switches, load switches, voltage supervisors, and motor controllers. Diodes Incorporated also has timing, connectivity, switching, and signal integrity solutions for high-speed signals.

The company's product focus is on end-user equipment markets such as satellite TV set-top boxes, portable DVD players, datacom devices, ADSL modems, power supplies, medical devices (non-life support devices/systems), PCs and notebooks, flat panel displays, digital cameras, mobile handsets, AC-to-DC and DC-to-DC conversion, Wireless 802.11 LAN access points, brushless DC motor fans, serial connectivity, and automotive applications.

Global Locations 

Corporate headquarters and Americas’ sales offices:

 Plano, Texas, US Headquarters
 Milpitas, California, US

Design, marketing, and engineering centers:

 Plano, Texas, US
 Milpitas, California, US
Taipei, Taiwan
Taoyuan City, Taiwan
Zhubei City, Taiwan
Shanghai, China
Yangzhou, China
Oldham, UK
Neuhaus, Germany
Wafer fabrication facilities:

 Oldham, UK
 Greenock, UK
 South Portland, Maine, US
Shanghai, China (two facilities)

Assembly and test facilities: 
Shanghai, China
Jinan, China 
Chengdu, China
Neuhaus, Germany
Jhongli, Taiwan
Additional engineering, sales, warehouse, and logistics offices:

 Taipei, Taiwan
 Hong Kong
 Oldham, UK
 Shanghai, China
 Shenzhen, China
 Wuhan, China
 Yangzhou, China
Seongnam-si, South Korea
Munich, Germany
Frankfurt, Germany

References 

Semiconductor companies of the United States
Equipment semiconductor companies
Manufacturing companies based in Texas
Companies based in Plano, Texas
American companies established in 1959
Electronics companies established in 1959
1959 establishments in Texas
Companies listed on the Nasdaq